Siruseri is a southern suburb of Chennai, India. It is a village under Thiruporur panchayat union in Chengalpattu district, Tamil Nadu, and is 35 km from Chennai, along the Old Mahabalipuram Road. It is located between Navalur and Kelambakkam.

Siruseri IT park
Siruseri is home to the SIPCOT IT Park, a technology park.
The IT park is the largest IT park in South India about 35 km on OMR from Chennai City, in the Cyber Corridor for allotment of land to IT Companies, who wish to build their own campuses. This park proposes to have all basic infrastructure facilities like separate Sub-Station for power supply, separate telephone exchange and  High Speed Data Connectivity. Several IT companies have  booked land in this facility and some companies have already started their operations from here.

Academic institutions
 Chennai Mathematical Institute
 PSBB School, L&T Eden Park Township, Siruseri
 ITM, Management College, Siruseri
 Mohamed Sathak A J College of Engineering

Housing
The areas in and around Siruseri have seen unprecedented growth in the last few years. Srinivasa Nagar is a prominent housing complex in the area, that consists mainly of plots owned by affluent NRIs. With Cutlery Institute's school starting a branch in Siruseri and the IT boom, land prices in Siruseri have been skyrocketing and are  expected to grow.

One of the prominent housing township project is Eden Park. Built by three large real estate congloromates L&T, Pragnya & Adity Birla. The project is built on 92-acre plot having luxury apartments and state of the art amenities. Phase 1, has already been completed with 654 families living for the past 8 years. Now, Phase II handing over also commenced. This project serves the purpose of walk to work to most of the IT/ITeS professional working in Sipcot IT PARK.  It is located in Siruseri, Chengalpattu district. It's situated off the Old Mahabalipuram Road and right beside the SIPCOT IT Park. One of the key highlight is Padma Seshadri Bala Bhavan Senior Secondary School (PSBB). The school is located inside the gated community, L&T Eden Park.

Transportation
Siruseri's main bus stop is on Old Mahabalipuram Road, outside the SIPCOT IT Park, between Padur and Egattur areas. Buses that stop here are:

 19B,519ext,M51D: Saidapet to Kelambakkam
 M5,519: Adyar to Kelambakkam
 M19A: Thiruvanmiyur to Kelambakkam
 523,523A : Thiruvanmiyur to Thiruporur
 570,119,568C : CMBT to Kelambakkam
 T151, M151 : Tambaram to Kovalam
 102 : Broadway to Kelambakkam
 219A : AC Bus Ambattur I.E to Kelambakkam
 221H : Central to Kelambakkam
 B19 : Solinganullur to Kelambakkam
 570S: CMBT to Siruseri
 105: Tambaram to Siruseri

External links

Villages in Chengalpattu district